Clelandella madeirensis is a species of sea snail, a marine gastropod mollusk in the family Trochidae, the top snails.

Description
The height of the shell attains 8 mm.

Distribution
This species occurs in the Atlantic Ocean off Madeira.

References

External links
 
 Gofas, S. (2005). Geographical differentiation in Clelandella (Gastropoda: Trochidae) in the northeastern Atlantic. Journal of Molluscan Studies. 71: 133-144

madeirensis
Gastropods described in 2005